Empty books or blank books are novelty books whose title indicates that they treat some serious subject, but whose pages have been left intentionally blank. The joke is that "nothing" is the answer to whatever the title of the book asserts. 

A number of such titles have been published as attempts at satire or polemic, to some commercial success. In 2017, The Guardian commented that the trend of publishing political empty books had led to "the noble art of political parody [descending] into a one-joke turn that avoids words".

List of empty books

This list includes, in order of publication, empty books that have been published with an ISBN or have received coverage in reliable sources unrelated to the author. The books may have book design features such as front matter, a table of contents, page numbers, etc.,  as long as the pages are otherwise blank.
A record of the statesmanship and political achievements of Gen. Winfield Scott Hancock, regular Democratic nominee for president of the United States (1880). A political pamphlet attacking Winfield Scott Hancock, Democratic nominee for president in the 1880 United States presidential election
Political Achievements of the Earl of Dalkeith (1880). A political pamphlet attacking William Montagu Douglas Scott, 6th Duke of Buccleuch.
Sussol, Max (1986). O Que Se Pode Fazer Sexualmente Após 80 Anos (translated from Brazilian Portuguese: "What can you do sexually after 80 years old"). 120 empty pages. ISBN 979-0090017033.
 Popular among British university students who used it as a notebook.
 (Available on Amazon) but similar, earlier versions authored by others exist e.g. by Everything Men Know About Women by Dr. Alan Francis.

 200 blank pages in various shades of the color gray. Removed from circulation after legal action by the publisher of the novel Fifty Shades of Grey.
 100 pages.
  Angered UKIP supporters who bought it in the belief that it contained actual pronouncements by Nigel Farage.
 Authored by former Oregon First Lady Cylvia Hayes, under a pseudonym.

 A bestseller on Amazon.com and promoted on Twitter by Donald Trump.
  A "bestseller on Amazon.com" (where it was the 543rd most sold book), until it was removed

See also
 Blank piece of paper (protest tactic)
"The Unsuccessful Self-Treatment of a Case of "Writer's Block""

References

Books by type
Novelty items